Celia Kwok (born 9 December 1986) is a Hong Kong actress and fashion model, known for Due West: Our Sex Journey (2012) and Lan Kwai Fong 3 (2014).

Biography
A native of Hong Kong, Celia Kwok began her career as a fashion model in 2007, and signed with the agency Jacso Entertainment.

Celia Kwok had her first experience in front of the camera in 2008, and she was chosen to act as a support actor in Happy Funeral, a comedy film starring Chung Him Law, Elanne Kwong, and Eric Tsang.

Celia Kwok first rose to prominence in 2012 for playing Zeta in the erotica film Due West: Our Sex Journey.

In 2014, she co-starred with Ava Yu, Jeana Ho and Christine Ng in the film Lan Kwai Fong 3 as Papa, a kindergarten teacher.

Filmography

Film

References

External links

21st-century Hong Kong actresses
Living people
Hong Kong female models
Hong Kong film actresses
1986 births